Juan Luis Galiardo Comes (2 March 1940 – 22 June 2012) was a Spanish television, theater and film actor.

Life
The eldest of six children, Juan Luis Galiardo Comes was born in San Roque, Cádiz, but spent most of his childhood and youth in Badajoz, where his father had moved following working opportunities. After finishing his secondary education in Seville, Galiardo studied Agricultural Engineering at the University of Madrid. He abandoned his studies in 1961, to enroll the following year at Spain's National Film School (EOC) where he trained as an actor. He began his career working in the theater under the direction of José Luis Alonso de Santos in the theater María Guerrero. With some fellow actors he founded the T.E.I. (Independent Experimental Theatre), directed by Miguel Narros.

Galiardo made his film debut in the leading role in Julio Diamante's film El arte de vivir (The Art of Living) (1965). In the next sixteen years he appeared in more than fifty motion pictures, becoming one of the most popular romantic lead actors of Spanish films thanks in great part to his matinee idol good looks. Among his film of this period are notable his performances in Carlos Saura's Stress es tres, tres (Stress is three, three) (1968), Vicente Aranda's Clara es el precio (Clara is the Price) (1974), and two films by Jaime Camino: Mañana será otro dia (Tomorrow is another day) (1966) and La campanada (Pealing of the Bells) (1980).

In 1979, Galiardo went to Mexico where he lived for five years, appearing in secondary roles in Mexican films as well as in popular television dramas.  In 1982 he received the Heraldo award as best actor

In 1986, he returned to Spain continuing his acting career, but he also became involved in film production.  With his own production company, Penélope Films, he produced the T.V series Turno de oficio  and films like El disputado voto del señor Cayo, a film directed by Antonio Giménez-Rico.

With his work in television in Turno de oficio (1986- 1987), Galiardo began to break away from his previous image of leading-man, accepting more dramatic roles and showing a wider range in this, the third phase of his career. He co-starred in some big projects both in film and television as in La Regenta, a production for TVE directed by Fernando Mendez-Leite.
Among his most notable films are: Soldadito español (1988); Guarapo (1989), Don Juan, mi querido fantasma (1989); Madregilda (1993), Familia (1996) directed by Fernando León de Aranoa Pajarico (1997) a film directed by Carlos Saura; Adiós con el corazón (1999), a film directed by José Luis García Sánchez for which Galiardo won the Goya Award as best actor in 2000; Lázaro de Tormes (2000); El caballero Don Quijote (2001) and Miguel y William (2007).  His roles in this two last films allowed him to be the only actor to play both Miguel de Cervantes and his most famous creation Don Quijote de la Mancha.

In 2007 he played Fidel Castro in I Love Miami a parody of the famous dictator possible flight to Miami as just another rafter. The following year Galirado played an important role in the gay themed film Clandestinos, who raised some controversy mainly due to the promotional image of the film. His last film was La chispa de la vida (2010) under the direction of Alex de la Iglesia. He died, aged 72, in Madrid of lung cancer.

Selected filmography

 Canción de juventud (1962) - Chico (uncredited)
 Le tre spade di Zorro (1963) - Felipe
 El camino (1963) - Novio de Mica
 Rueda de sospechosos (1964) - El Moro
 El arte de vivir (1965) - Juanjo
 Crimen de doble filo (1965) - Fotógrafo
 Two Sergeants of General Custer (1965) - Fidanzato di Mary
 Megatón Ye-Ye (1965) - Fausto (voice, uncredited)
 Seven Golden Men (1965)
 El juego de la oca (1965) - Amigo en fiesta de cumpleaños
 Komm mit zur blauen Adria (1966)
 En Andalucía nació el amor (1966) - Luis
 Hoy como ayer (1966) - Boyfriend in Discotheque
 Vestida de novia (1966)
 Querido profesor (1966)
 El padre Manolo (1967) - Ricardo, el novio de la sobrina de Manolo
 Mañana será otro día (1967) - Paco
 Acteón (1967) - Joven
 Novios 68 (1967) - Antonio, novio de Julia
 No desearás la mujer de tu prójimo (1968) - Carlos
 La chica de los anuncios (1968) - Leo
 Giugno '44 - Sbarcheremo in Normandia (1968) - Rob Master
 Stress Is Three (1968) - Antonio
 Cristina Guzmán (1968) - Jorge
 La canción del olvido (1969) - Capitán Leonello
 Las nenas del mini-mini (1969) - Chalo
 Pepa Doncel (1969) - Gonzalo Carvajal Sastre
 Después de los nueve meses (1970) - Pablo Román
 Coqueluche (1970) - Juan Castro
 Una señora llamada Andrés (1970) - Andrés Guzmán
 El apartamento de la tentación (1971) - Alberto
 Fieras sin jaula (1971) - Pietro
 Hector the Mighty (1972) - Paride
 Antony and Cleopatra (1972) - Alexas
 Bianco rosso e... (1972) - Guido
 Alta tensión (1972) - José
 The Call of the Wild (1972) - Seze
 Autopsia (1973) - Juan
 El juego del adulterio (1973) - Andrés
 Death's Newlyweds (1975) - Juan Ramón Soler
 Clara is the Price (1975) - Jorge
 El clan de los inmorales (1975)
 The Good Days Lost (1975) - Lorenzo
 Naked Therapy (1975) - Ricardo
 Unmarried Mothers (1975)
 Imposible para una solterona (1976) - Luis
 Mayordomo para todo (1976) - Carlos
 El alijo (1976) - Curro
 Lucecita (1976)
 Un día con Sergio (1976) - Sergio Melgar
 La promesa (1976)
 El límite del amor (1976) - Juan
 Hasta que el matrimonio nos separe (1977) - Chus
 Inquisition (1977) - Jean Duprat
 Esposa de día, amante de noche (1977) - Federico
 El ladrido (1977) - Mauro
 Comando Txikia: Muerte de un presidente (1978) - Julen
 Una familia decente (1978) - Juan Salcedo
 Guyana: Cult of the Damned (1979) - Reporter
 Father Cami's Wedding (1979) - José Lloret
 And in the Third Year, He Rose Again (1980) - Automovilista
 La campanada (1980) - Ambros
 Quiero soñar (1981) - Juan Luis
 Rastro de muerte (1981)
 Préstame tu mujer (1981) - Rodolfo
 Con el cuerpo prestado (1983) - Pedro
 The Disputed Vote of Mr. Cayo (1986) - Víctor
 Policía (1987) - Maxi
 La guerra de los locos (1987) - Don Salvador
 Guarapo (1987)
 El señor de los llanos (1987) - Fabián Insausti
 Pasodoble (1988) - Diputado
 Soldadito español (1988) - Francisco Calleja
 El vuelo de la paloma (1989) - Luis Doncel
 Supporting Roles (1989) - Alejandro
 Don Juan, mi querido fantasma (1990) - Don Juan Tenorio / Don Juan Marquina
 Yo soy ésa (1990) - Padre Benito
 Capità Escalaborns (1991) - El Borni
 Ho sap el ministre? (1991) - Francisco Carmona
 La taberna fantástica (1991)
 Catorce estaciones (1991) - Lázaro
 Los mares del sur (1992) - Pepe Carvalho
 Madregilda (1993) - Legionario
 Todos a la cárcel (1993) - Muñagorri
 ¡Por fin solos! (1994) - Héctor Lafuente
 Enciende mi pasión (1994) - Lucas
 Los hombres siempre mienten (1995) - Adolfo
 Así en el cielo como en la tierra (1995) - Ruíz del Río
 Suspiros de España (y Portugal) (1995) - Fray Liborio / Juan
 Nexo (1995) - Abogado
 Mar de luna (1995)
 La leyenda de Balthasar el Castrado (1996) - Narrador
 Familia (1996) - Santiago
 Tramway to Malvarrosa (1996) - Arsenio
 Siempre hay un camino a la derecha (1997) - Juan
 Pajarico (1997) - Tío Emilio
 Tango (1997) - Angelo Larroca
 ¡Qué vecinos tan animales! (1998) - Sres. Galápagos (voice)
 The Girl of Your Dreams (1998) - Embajador
 Sí, quiero... (1999) - Don Jaime
 Esa Maldita Costilla (1999) - Génesis (voice)
 Adiós con el corazón (2000) - Juan
 Lázaro de Tormes (2001) - Alcalde
 Torrente 2: Misión en Marbella (2001) - Gentleman
 Buñuel y la mesa del rey Salomón (2001) - Crítico de Cine
 Vivancos 3 (2002) - Pajarda
 Rosa la China (2002) - Dulzura
 El caballero Don Quijote (2002) - Don Quijote
 Lisístrata (2002) - Hepatitos
 El oro de Moscú (2003) - Alberto Tajuña
 Dripping (2003) - Baron de Cervera
 Franky Banderas (2004) - Avelino
 I Love Miami (2006) - Fidel / Alejandro
 El coronel Macià (2006) - Capitán General Polavieja
 Pobre juventud (2006) - Marcelo
 Miguel y William (2007) - Miguel de Cervantes
 Clandestinos (2007) - Germán
 El asesino a sueldo (2009) - Inspector
 La llegenda de l'innombrable (2010) - Innombrable
 La daga de Rasputín (2011) - Zadkin
 As Luck Would Have It (2011) - Alcalde

Notes

References
 D’Lugo, Marvin.  Guide to the Cinema of Spain. Greenwood Press, 1997.

External links
 

1940 births
2012 deaths
Spanish male film actors
Spanish male television actors